Ian Shaw was a Scotland international rugby union player.

Rugby Union career

Amateur career

He played for Glasgow HSFP.

Provincial career

He was capped for Glasgow District. Shaw played at Fly-half in the 1930 inter-city match.

International career

He scored a drop goal in the match against Ireland.

Family

His brother Wilson Shaw was also capped for Scotland.

References

Sources

 Bath, Richard (ed.) The Scotland Rugby Miscellany (Vision Sports Publishing Ltd, 2007 )

1911 births
1973 deaths
Scottish rugby union players
Scotland international rugby union players
Glasgow HSFP players
Glasgow District (rugby union) players
Rugby union players from Glasgow
Rugby union centres